The 2013 Latvian Higher League was the 22nd season of top-tier football in Latvia. FC Daugava were the defending champions. The season started on 29 March 2013.

The league comprised ten teams. The champions of this season were FK Ventspils, followed by Skonto FC

Teams
The league had a ten-team circuit like the 2012 season.
2012 Latvian First League champions Ilūkstes NSS from Ilūkste were directly promoted.

FK Daugava Rīga finished the 2012 season in ninth place and were therefore required to compete in a two-legged promotion/relegation play-off against First Division runners-up BFC Daugava. FK Daugava Riga won the play-off 4–1 on aggregate and therefore stayed in the Higher League.

Stadiums and locations

Personnel and kits
Note: Flags indicate national team as has been defined under FIFA eligibility rules. Players and Managers may hold more than one non-FIFA nationality.

Managerial changes

Broadcasting 
As in the previous season most of the matches are being transmitted live via sportacentrs.com online and  TV channel. In June 2012 broadcasting rights were also bought by the English company Bet365. Since 2012, the league's homepage futbolavirsliga.lv has been active and since September 2012 this website has been accompanied by the InStat Football system, showing information and analysis of each match individually. Since October 2012, the Virslīga has also had its own analytical broadcast after each round of matches with football experts discussing the games and future events connected to Latvian football. It is transmitted via  TV.

League table

Relegation play-offs
The 9th-placed sides will face the runners-up of the 2013 Latvian First League in a two-legged play-off, with the winner being awarded a spot in the 2014 Higher League competition.

FS METTA/LU won 5–2 on aggregate.

Results

Season statistics

Top scorers

Player of the Month

Manager of the Month

Team of the Tournament

LFF version

Sporta Avīze version

sportacentrs.com version

Awards

References 

Latvian Higher League seasons
1
Latvia
Latvia